Firuzeh County, formerly Binalud County, is in Razavi Khorasan province, Iran. The capital of the county is the city of Firuzeh. At the 2006 census, the region's population (as Taghenkoh District and most of Takht-e Jolgeh District of Nishapur County) was 49,823 in 12,581 households. The following census in 2011 counted 42,739 people in 12,351 households, by which time those parts had been separated from the county to form Firuzeh County. At the 2016 census, the county's population was 37,539 in 11,783 households.

Administrative divisions

The population history and structural changes of Firuzeh County's administrative divisions over three consecutive censuses are shown in the following table. The latest census shows two districts, four rural districts, and two cities.

References

 

Counties of Razavi Khorasan Province